Peoples Radio is a Dhaka-based 24-hour private FM Radio station in Bangladesh. It started the commercial launching on 11 December 2011.

External links
 

Radio stations in Bangladesh